Bana al-Abed (born 7 June 2009) is a Syrian girl from Aleppo, Syria who, with assistance from her English-speaking mother, sent messages through Twitter documenting the siege of the city. Most of these tweets have documented issues such as airstrikes, destruction, hunger, displacement, the prospect of her and her family's death, her longing for a peaceful childhood, the al-Bab district of eastern Aleppo, and her general calls for peace.

Al-Abed's Twitter account, @AlabedBana, was created on 24 September 2016. Twitter has verified al-Abed's account, indicating that "an account of public interest is authentic."  The account has nearly 370,000 followers, and is managed by Bana's mother Fatemah. On 4 December 2016, during the 17th Aleppo offensive, her account was taken down, but it was back up within two days and the account has been tweeting since.

Early life

Bana al-Abed's mother, Fatemah, was an English teacher before the war. Her father Ghassan is a lawyer who worked for the ruling local council in southeastern Aleppo. He was injured on 21 December 2016.  She has two younger brothers, Noor and Mohamed. Bana also reportedly wanted to be a teacher, but stopped going to school because of the war which destroyed it.

Bana received an ebook copy of Harry Potter from J. K. Rowling in November 2016 after the account tweeted that she could not obtain a physical copy locally. Her family's house was destroyed during a bombing later that month, but she and her family said that they survived with minor injuries.

After the success of the Aleppo offensive by government forces, Turkey and Russia agreed on a ceasefire and evacuation of rebels and civilians from Aleppo. When the evacuations did not go as planned, her mother mentioned Turkish Foreign Minister Mevlüt Çavuşoğlu for making the ceasefire work, and the Foreign Minister said that they were doing all they could to get her and others out. On 19 December 2016, it was reported that Bana Alabed was among the 350 people who were evacuated from the former rebel-held districts of Aleppo on that day after its capture by government forces.

After evacuating Aleppo, Bana was interviewed by Hadi Al Abdullah, where she clarifies that her father was injured in the Sukari district when their house was bombed.

On 21 December, Bana and her family were officially allowed to live in Turkey, and met President Recep Tayyip Erdoğan in front of international press.

On 7 April 2017, the Twitter account tweeted in support of the Shayrat missile strike ordered by U.S. President Donald Trump as a reaction to the Khan Shaykhun chemical weapons attack three days before.

On 12 May 2017, Bana and her family were granted Turkish citizenship by Turkish President Recep Tayyip Erdoğan.

In October 2017, Bana visited New York. At the Headquarters of the United Nations she appeared in a recorded a Twitter message.

Simon and Schuster published her memoir, entitled Dear World.

In 2018, Bana was honoured with the Rising Star Award at The Asian Awards.

Criticism
Her account has been subject to criticism from vocal opponents, including the setting up of accounts to publicly criticize the account in question. The Twitter account drew a great number of trolls and voices sympathetic to the Syrian government and its Russian backers, who assailed Bana as a fraud. Some called Bana and her mother fictions created by the United States as a propaganda tool to malign the Syrian and Russian governments.

A journalist for The New Yorker observed that her "video statements often have a scripted quality, as if she is being coached by her mother to communicate her thoughts in a language that she is only beginning to learn."

In a now deleted tweet, the account tweeted it is "better to start 3rd world war instead of letting Russia & assad commit #HolocaustAleppo".

References

External links

 Analysis of the account by Bellingcat

2009 births
People from Aleppo
Living people
People of the Syrian civil war
Twitter controversies
Syrian children
Child activists
Syrian emigrants to Turkey
People with acquired Turkish citizenship